The 2020 Slovenian Athletics Championships was the 29th edition of the national championship in outdoor track and field for athletes in Slovenia. It was held between 25–26 July in Celje.

Results

Men

Women

References

Results
 PRVENSTVO SLOVENIJE ZA ČLANE IN ČLANICE Rezultati Celje, 25.07. - 26.07.2020. Slovenska Atletika. Retrieved 2021-03-20.

External links
Slovenia Athletics Federation website

2020
Slovenian Championships
Slovenian Athletics Championships
Sport in Celje